John Felton (born 5 December 1960 in Kyogle) is an Australian slalom canoeist who competed from the late 1970s to the mid-1990s. He finished 14th in the C-2 event at the 1996 Summer Olympics in Atlanta.

John Felton commenced canoeing in 1974, he subsequently competed internationally from 1979 – 1983 when he retired having won a Commonwealth Title (Scotland, 1981) and having finished as high as 4th in the World Championships (Jonquiere, Canada 1979). After Canoe Slalom was readmitted to the Olympic Games in 1992 he came out of retirement in 1993 (at 32 years of age) and teamed up again with Andrew Wilson for a shot at the Atlanta Olympic Games. After qualifying for the Games and 4 weeks before the start he broke 2 ribs in a training accident in Augsburg, Germany (the site of the 1972 Olympics). They went on to finish 14th at the 1996 Olympics.

After these Games the then Minister for The Olympics – Michael Knight threw the sport of canoe slalom out of the Olympic Games. The International Canoe Federation approached John to head the project to have canoe slalom readmitted to the Olympic Program. Felton was successful and in August 1997 slalom was readmitted. Felton is credited along with Australian Engineer Peter Heeley and 5 time World slalom Champion Richard Fox as the inventors of the world's first totally artificial, pumped whitewater course. John oversaw the construction of the facility as the ICF whitewater specialist and was subsequently appointed to the position of Competition Manager for the 2000 Olympic Games.

Subsequently, he has consulted on many artificial whitewater courses throughout the world, spoken on sustainability and ensuring legacy at a number of outdoor and sports conferences and is the lead whitewater designer (with his company Whitewater Parks International) of the London 2012 Whitewater Canoe/Kayak – Slalom venue at Broxbourne in the United Kingdom.

References
 Australia Olympic Committee
Sports-Reference.com profile
Canoeing at the 1996 Summer Olympics – Men's slalom C-2 Wikipedia Olympic Reference
 ABC Television
 Sports Illustrated
 Whitewater Parks International
 New Zealand Times
 Australian Canoeing Inc.

1960 births
Australian male canoeists
Canoeists at the 1996 Summer Olympics
Living people
Olympic canoeists of Australia